= Grace Wyngaard =

Grace Wyngaard is an American biologist at James Madison University and an Elected Fellow of the American Association for the Advancement of Science.
